Manchester is a city in Northwest England.  The M15 postcode area is to the southwest of the centre of the city and includes the areas of Hulme, and parts of Moss Side and  Chorlton-on-Medlock.  The postcode area contains 33 listed buildings that are recorded in the National Heritage List for England.  Of these, two are listed at Grade II*, the middle grade of the three grades, and the others are at Grade II, the lowest grade.

Hulme and Moss Side, to the west of the area, contain mainly industrial and residential buildings.  The industrial buildings that have survived and are listed include a floodgate, canal offices, a former canal warehouse, a canal, a brewery, a former cotton mill, and a flour mill.  Elsewhere are houses, churches and associated buildings, a former public house, a railway bridge, a boundary stone, and two former theatres.  In Chorlton-on-Medlock most of the listed buildings are university buildings, although many have been altered from their original purposes.  This part of the area also includes a church and an art gallery.


Key

Buildings

Notes and references

Notes

Citations

Sources

Lists of listed buildings in Greater Manchester
Buildings and structures in Manchester